Buena Vista is an unincorporated community in Bexar County, in the U.S. state of Texas. It is located within the Greater San Antonio metropolitan area.

History
The area in what is known as Buena Vista was first settled sometime before 1900. It had several houses and a store in the mid-1930s.

Geography

Education
In the mid-1930s, Buena Vista had a school with five teachers for students in first through eighth grades until it joined the Southside Independent School District in the early 1950s. The community continues to be served by the Southside ISD today.

References

Unincorporated communities in Bexar County, Texas
Unincorporated communities in Texas
Greater San Antonio